Xiądz is the eighth EP by Polish extreme metal band Behemoth. It was released on 1 November 2014 through New Aeon Musick in a limited edition of 2,000 copies; all copies were hand numbered by the band. The EP features three tracks, including "Nieboga Czarny Xiądz" from The Satanist recording session, "Towards the Dying Sun We March" from Evangelion recording session, along with re-recorded "Moonspell Rites", originally released in 1994 on And the Forests Dream Eternally EP. The title is of the old Polish language that translates to 'Priest'.

Track listing

Personnel

References 

2014 EPs
Behemoth (band) EPs
Albums produced by Adam Darski